Jure Košir (born 24 April 1972 is a former Slovenian alpine skier.

Career
Košir's first international success was the title of the world junior champion in super G, won in Hemsedal in 1991. Later he focused in technical disciplines, esp. slalom and made quick progress, noticed also by his good friend, Italian champion Alberto Tomba. The first peak of his career was achieved in the season 1993/94 when he achieved the first World Cup victory for independent Slovenia, won the bronze medal at the 1994 Winter Olympics in Lillehammer and finished the season at the 3rd place of the World Cup slalom standings.

The next season, 1994/95, was successful as well. He couldn't beat Alberto Tomba but he won three World Cup medals: silver in giant slalom standings, bronze in slalom and overall standings.

The next few seasons were slightly less successful until he reached his second peak of his career in 1998/99 when he won two more slalom races (one of them was at his "home" resort in Kranjska Gora) and finished the season at the 2nd place of the World Cup slalom standings. After this season his career gradually went down so in 2005 he announced he would conclude his career after the 2005/06 season. He confirmed his retirement after the 2006 Winter Olympics when he was not chosen to compete in slalom.

Besides that he won additional 20 top 3 podiums, 18 of them at slalom.

Besides his achievements in sport, he has also engaged in musical activity in the mid-1990s, during the peak of his popularity. He recorded a few rap songs, one of them, "Včasih smučam hit, včasih pa počas" ("Sometimes I ski fast, sometimes I ski slowly"), being quite popular in Slovenia. He was also a member of a rap group, Pasji kartel ("Dog's cartel").

He officially ended his skiing career on 25 March 2006 with an event in Kranjska Gora including special skiing competition between ski legends (Bojan Križaj, Ingemar Stenmark, Boris Strel, Mateja Svet, Alberto Tomba and many others) and many music performances.

World Cup results

Season standings

Race podiums
 3 wins (3 SL)
 20 podiums (18 SL, 2 GS)

Olympic Games results

World Championships results

External links
 
 
 

1972 births
Living people
Slovenian male alpine skiers
Slovenian rappers
Olympic alpine skiers of Slovenia
Alpine skiers at the 1992 Winter Olympics
Alpine skiers at the 1994 Winter Olympics
Alpine skiers at the 1998 Winter Olympics
Alpine skiers at the 2002 Winter Olympics
Olympic bronze medalists for Slovenia
Olympic medalists in alpine skiing
Medalists at the 1994 Winter Olympics
People from the Municipality of Kranjska Gora